Gaoming Prison is a prison in the Hecheng Subdistrict of the Gaoming District, Foshan City, Guangdong Province, China. Established in 1957, prisoners work on the adjacent Xi'an Farm.

See also

Other prisons in Guangdong:

 Jiangmen Prison
 Foshan Prison
 Panyu Prison
 Jiaoling Prison
 Lianping Prison

References

External links 

Official site of the Guangdong Prison Administrative Bureau - Gaoming Prison

Prisons in Guangdong
1957 establishments in China
Buildings and structures in Foshan